William of Nassau may refer to:

 William I, Count of Nassau-Siegen (1487–1559), William the Rich
 William the Silent, count of Nassau (1533–1584); later Willem of Orange 
 Alternative title for Het Wilhelmus, the Dutch national anthem (named after the above)
 William of Nassau (1601–1627), grandson of the above
 William of Nassau (1620–1679), son of the above
 William, Count of Nassau-Siegen (1592–1642)
 William of Nassau-Weilburg (1792–1839), duke of Nassau
 William I of the Netherlands (1772–1843), Count of Nassau (1840-1843), Prince of Nassau-Orange-Fulda, Prince of Orange-Nassau